Etruria was a region of Central Italy, located in an area that covered part of what are now most of Tuscany, northern Lazio, and northern and western Umbria.

Etruscan Etruria
The ancient people of Etruria 
are identified as Etruscans. Their complex culture centered on numerous city-states that arose during the Villanovan period in the ninth century BC, and they were very powerful during the Orientalizing Archaic periods.

The Etruscans were a dominant culture in Italy by 650 BC, surpassing other ancient Italic peoples such as the Ligures. Their influence may be seen beyond Etruria's confines in the Po River Valley and Latium, as well as in Campania and through their contact with the Greek colonies in Southern Italy (including Sicily). Indeed, at some Etruscan tombs, such as those of the Tumulus di Montefortini at Comeana (see Carmignano) in Tuscany, physical evidence of trade with Egypt has been found by archaeologists—fine Egyptian faience cups are an example. Such trade occurred either directly with Egypt or through intermediaries such as Greek or Phoenician sailors.

Rome was influenced strongly by the Etruscans even though it was separated from the early boundary of Etruria by the Silva Ciminia, the Ciminian Forest. A series of Etruscan kings ruled Rome until 509 BC, when the last Etruscan king, Lucius Tarquinius Superbus, was removed from power and the Roman Republic was established. The Etruscans are credited with influencing Roman architecture and ritual practice; it was under the Etruscan kings that important structures such as the Capitolium, Cloaca Maxima, and Via Sacra were realized.

The Etruscan civilization was responsible for much of the Greek culture imported into early Republican Rome, including the twelve Olympian deities, the growing of olives and grapes, the Latin alphabet (adapted from the Greek alphabet), architecture (such as the arch), and engineering elements such as sewers and drainage systems.

Territorial subdivision of Etruria
Etruria usually is divided into two main territories, called Northern Etruria and Southern Etruria, to which must be added the northernmost territories that were called Etruria Padana, and the southernmost territories that were called Etruria Campana.
 Northern Etruria - much of modern Tuscany, from the Arno river to the north, the Apennines to the east, and the Albegna river to the south of Tuscany; furthermore, the Etruscan territories north to Perugia in modern Umbria
 Southern Etruria - small portions of the most southern areas of Tuscany, all of northern and central Lazio to the gates of Rome
 Etruria Padana (Padanian Etruria) - territories in Emilia-Romagna and in the southern extremity of Lombardy and Veneto, in northern Italy
 Etruria Campana (Campanian Etruria) - some territories in the Campania region of southern Italy

Cities of Etruria

Latin and Italian names are given between parentheses:
 Arritim (Arretium, Arezzo)
 Atria (Adria)
 Caisra (Caere, Cerveteri)
 Clevsin (Clusium, Chiusi)
 Curtun (Cortonium, Cortona)
 Felathri (Volaterrae, Volterra)
 Fufluna (Populonium, Populonia)
 Parusia (Perusia, Perugia)
 Tarchna (Volscian Anxur) (Tarracina, Terracina)
 Tarchnal (Tarquinii, Tarquinia)
 Veii (Veii, Veio)
 Vetluna (Vetulonium, Vetulonia)
 Vipsul (Faesulae, Fiesole)
 Velch (Vulci, Volci)
 Velzna (Volsiniia, Volsinii)

There was a period between 600 BC and 500 BC, during which twelve Etruscan city-states formed a loose confederation known as the Etruscan League. Etruscan was the official language for their meetings. When Etruria was conquered by the Roman Republic, Latin became the official language.

Roman Etruria
In the Augustan organization of Roman Italy, Etruria was the name of a region (Regio VII). Its borders were the Tiber, the Tyrrhenian Sea, the Apuan Alps, and the Apennines. This is roughly coincident with those of Etruria before the Roman period that began in 509 BC.

Etruria in modern history
The Grand Duchy of Tuscany (which existed 1569–1801 and 1814–1859) styled itself in Latin as Magnus Ducatus Etruriae (Grand Duchy of Etruria). The name Etruria also was applied to the Kingdom of Etruria, an ephemeral client state of Napoleon I of France that replaced the Grand Duchy between 1801 and 1807.

A particularly noteworthy work dealing with Etruscan locations is D. H. Lawrence's Sketches of Etruscan Places and other Italian essays.

See also
 Padanian Etruria
 Etruscan history
 Etruscan origins
 Etruscan cities
 Etruscan civilization
 Etruscan society
 Etruscan language
 Etruscan mythology
 Kingdom of Etruria
 Tuscia

References

Bibliography
 
  Chronology of Etruscan Italy, .

External links

 Cities and Cemeteries of Etruria, by George Dennis, an overview of Etruscan civilisation
 

Geographical, historical and cultural regions of Italy
 
Italian states
Etruscan sites
History of Umbria
Villanovan culture